Saad Hussain (Arabic:سعد حسين) (born 7 March 1993) is a Qatari footballer. He currently plays for Al-Salliya.

References

External links
 

Qatari footballers
1993 births
Living people
Al-Shahania SC players
Al-Rayyan SC players
Al-Sailiya SC players
Qatar Stars League players
Qatari Second Division players
Association football fullbacks
Association football midfielders